{{DISPLAYTITLE:C10H12O3}}
The molecular formula C10H12O3 (molar mass : 180.2 g/mol, exact mass : 180.0786438 u) may refer to :

 Anisyl acetate
 Canolol, a phenolic compound found in canola oil
 Carvonic acid
 Coniferyl alcohol
 Isopropylparaben
 Propylparaben